The Garden of Weeds is a 1924 American silent drama film directed by James Cruze and starring Betty Compson. It is based on the Broadway play Garden of Weeds by Leon Gordon and Doris Marquette.  Famous Players-Lasky produced and Paramount Pictures distributed.

Plot
As described in a review in a film magazine, of great wealth but lacking in the better traits, Phillip Flagg (Fellowes) maintains an estate which he calls his "Garden of Weeds" where he entertains girls of the stage until he tires of them. Attracted to Dorothy Delbridge (Compson), he has her fired because she refuses to accept his attentions. She later accept his invitation and becomes the mistress of "Garden of Weeds." Meeting Douglas Crawford (Baxter), another wealthy chap, she breaks with Flagg and marries him but has not the courage to reveal her past. Crawford engages Flagg’s butler, who threatens to reveal the secret. Flagg comes to see Crawford and arranges to fleece him in a shady deal. He begins to taunt her with veiled jibes to get even. Dorothy, unable to stand it any longer, reveals the truth. Crawford says he has known it all the time and proceeds to thrash Flagg, who falls over the balcony railing and is killed.

Cast

Preservation
With no prints of The Garden of Weeds located in any film archives, it is a lost film.

References

External links

1924 films
American silent feature films
Lost American films
Films directed by James Cruze
Paramount Pictures films
American films based on plays
1924 drama films
Silent American drama films
American black-and-white films
1920s American films